Callidiini is a tribe of beetles in the subfamily Cerambycinae, containing the following genera:

 Agada Fairmaire, 1892
 Callidiellum Linsley, 1940
 Callidium Fabricius, 1775
 Calydon Thomson, 1864
 Delagrangeus Pic, 1892
 Dolomius Fairmaire, 1903
 Dundaia Holzschuh, 1993
 Elatotrypes Fisher, 1919
 Gerdberndia Holzschuh, 1982
 Hylotrupes Audinet-Serville, 1834 
 Idiocalla Jordan, 1903
 Leioderes Redtenbacher, 1849
 Lioderina Ganglbauer, 1885
 Lucasianus Pic, 1891
 Melasmetus Reitter, 1912
 Meriellum Linsley, 1957
 Oupyrrhidium Pic, 1900
 Paraxylocrius Niisato, 2009
 Phymatodes Mulsant, 1839
 Physocnemum Haldeman, 1847
 Pnigomenus Bosq, 1951
 Poecilium Fairmaire, 1864
 Prionopsis Fairmaire, 1886
 Pronocera Motschulsky, 1859
 Prosemanotus Pic, 1933
 Pyrrhidium Fairmaire, 1864
 Rejzekius Adlbauer, 2008
 Ropalopus Mulsant, 1839
 Semanotus Mulsant, 1839
 Teorotrium Fairmaire, 1901
 Thrichocalydon Bosq, 1951
 Turanium Baeckmann, 1923
 Xylocrius LeConte, 1873

References

 
Polyphaga tribes